Philomel is another name for Philomela, a character from Greek mythology. It may refer to:

Nature
 A nightingale

Arts and Letters
 An abbreviated form of the name Philomela, a figure in Greek mythology often invoked as a symbol in literature.
 Philomel (musical instrument), similar to the violin
 Philomel Books, an American publishing imprint of Penguin Group
 "Philomel Cottage", a successful short story written by Agatha Christie, part of The Listerdale Mystery collection, subject of a number of adaptions
 Philomèle, a lost opera written in 1690 by French composer Marc-Antoine Charpentier
 Philomèle, an opera written in 1705 by French composer Louis de La Coste
 Philomel (Babbitt), a 1964 musical composition by American composer Milton Babbitt
 Philomel, the literary magazine of the Philomathean Society of the University of Pennsylvania

Military
 , a class of wooden-hulled ships built for the Royal Navy between 1859 and 1867
 , the name bestowed on six Royal Navy (UK) ships, including:
, an 18-gun  launched in 1806 and sold in 1817
, a 10-gun  launched in 1823 and sold in 1833
, an 8-gun brig launched in 1842
, a Philomel-class gunvessel launched in 1860 and sold in 1865
, a wooden screw gun vessel launched in 1867 and sold in 1886
, a Pearl-class cruiser launched in 1890
 , the main administrative naval base of the Royal New Zealand Navy.

Miscellaneous
 Jessica Philomele/Philomel Hartung, character in the video game Mana Khemia: Alchemists of Al-Revis